Sherzad Hafiz (Kurdish: شێرزاد حافز,  born May 14, 1958) is a current Member of Gorran Movement.

Sherzad Hafiz was a former Member of Parliament in the Kurdistan Regional Government of Iraq for Gorran Movement. He was a commander in the Peshmerga for the Patriotic Union of Kurdistan from 1979 until 1990 when he moved to London to treat injuries sustained on the front lines. He returned in 2001 to become mayor of Chamchamal. In 2005 he was elected by the people of Chamchamal into the Governing Council of Sulaymaniah and subsequently voted into the position of Chairman of the Governing Council.

References

External links 
 Article
Article
Article
Sbeiy Article

1958 births
Living people
Iraqi Kurdistani politicians
Gorran Movement politicians